Alexandria University is a public university in Alexandria, Egypt. It was established in 1938 as a satellite of Fouad University (the name of which was later changed to Cairo University), becoming an independent entity in 1942. It was known as Farouk University until after the Egyptian Revolution of 1952, when its name was changed to the University of Alexandria. Taha Hussein was the founding rector of Alexandria University. It is now the second largest university in Egypt and has many affiliations to various universities for ongoing research.

Alexandria University is one of the largest universities in Egypt, and the third university established after Cairo University and the American University in Cairo. Alexandria University has 21 faculties and 3 institutes that teach different types of social, medical, engineering, mathematics and other science. The university had other branches in Egypt outside Alexandria in Damanhour and Matrouh  which later became two independent universities. and International Branch in New Borg El Arab city. Other branches have been set up outside Egypt in Juba, South Sudan, and in N'Djamena, the capital of the Republic of Chad.

Administration 
 Abdelaziz Konsowa, president of Alexandria University
 Ashraf Elghandour, vice president for graduate studies and research
 Wael Nabil, vice president for education and student affairs
 Mohamed Abdel Azim Aboul Naga, vice president for community service and environmental development

Faculties 

At the time it became an independent institution in 1942, it had the following faculties:
 Faculty of Agriculture
 Faculty of Medicine (1942)
 Faculty of Arts (1938)
 Faculty of Commerce
 Faculty of Engineering (1941)
 Faculty of Law (1938)
 Faculty of Science (1942)

In 1989, four faculties, located in Alexandria and administered by Helwan University, were annexed to Alexandria University. These are the faculties of agriculture, fine arts, physical education for boys and physical education for girls.

Alexandria University now holds 24 faculties and institutes as follows:
 Faculty of Arts (1938)
 Faculty of Law (1938)
 Faculty of business (1942)
 Faculty of Engineering (1942)
 Faculty of Science (1942)
 Faculty of Agriculture (1942)
 Faculty of Medicine (1942)
 Faculty of Pharmacy (1947)
 Faculty of Nursing (1954)
 Faculty of Physical Education for Girls (1954)
 Faculty of Physical Education for Boys (1955)
 High Institute of Public Health (1956)
 Faculty of Fine Arts (1957)
 Faculty of Agriculture (Saba Basha) (1959)
 Faculty of Education (1966)
 Faculty of Dentistry (1970)
 Institute of Graduate Studies and Research (1972)
 Faculty of Veterinary Medicine (1975)
 Institute of Medical Research (1975)
 Faculty of Tourism and Hotels (1982)
 Faculty of Specific Education (1988)
 Faculty of Education for Early Childhood (1989) 
 Faculty of Economic Studies & Political Science (2014)
 Faculty of Computing and Data Science (2019)

Branches 
Alexandria University also opened branches inside Egypt and African and Middle Eastern countries:
 Chad branch (2010)
 South Sudan branch (2014)

 International Branch in New Borg El Arab city (2019)
 Alexandria National University (2021)
 Iraq branch

Notable alumni and faculty 
 Azer Bestavros (Faculty of Engineering, 1984) – Warren Distinguished Professor of Computer Science, Boston University, Boston, US
Mervat Seif el-Din – classical archaeologist and egyptologist, former director of the Graeco-Roman Museum
 Mostafa El-Abbadi – professor and historian
 Mohamed Hashish (Faculty of Engineering) – research scientist best known as the father of the abrasive water jet cutter
Mohammed Aboul-Fotouh Hassab (1913–2000) – professor of gastro-intestinal surgery; creator of surgical procedure known as Hassab's decongestion operation
 Mo Ibrahim (Faculty of Engineering) – Sudanese-British mobile communications entrepreneur and billionaire
Yahya El Mashad (Faculty of Engineering, 1952) – Egyptian nuclear physicist
Rebecca Joshua Okwaci (English language, literature, and translation) – South Sudanese politician, and the Minister of Telecommunications and Postal Services in the Government of the Republic of South Sudan
Tawfiq Saleh (English literature, 1949) – film director
Boshra Salem – professor, founder and the Chair of the Department of Environmental Sciences
William Linn Westermann (Visiting Professor 1948) – American papyrologist
Magdy Younes –  Canadian physician, medical researcher and academic
 Moustafa Youssef (Faculty of Engineering, 1997) – Egyptian computer scientist and engineer. First and only ACM fellow in the Middle East and Africa.
 Ahmed Zewail (Faculty of Science, 1967) – Nobel Prize in chemistry, 1999

Ranking 

Alexandria University was ranked 147th worldwide based on Times Higher Education's World University Rankings 2010–2011. The 2010 rankings were controversial, as a single professor's  practice of publishing a great number of articles in a journal of which he himself was the editor was identified as a crucial contributing factor for the high rating of Alexandria University. Alexandria University is ranked 1001+ worldwide based on Times Higher Education's World University Rankings 2020. Alexandria University is ranked 801-1000+ worldwide based on QS World University Rankings 2021. It is ranked 701-800 worldwide and 2nd in Egypt based on Shanghai ranking 2020.

See also 
 Borg El Arab University Hospital
 Educational institutions in Alexandria
 Education in Egypt
 List of universities in Egypt

References

External links 
 

 
1938 establishments in Egypt
Educational institutions established in 1938
Forestry education
Universities in Egypt
Organisations based in Alexandria